A Grand Love Story is a 1997 studio album by Kid Loco, originally released through Yellow Productions.

Reception
M. Tye Comer of CMJ New Music Report said, "When Kid Loco's A Grande Love Story was released in his homeland of France, the excitement caused by the producer's cinematic, downtempo trip-pop caused swells even on U.S. shores." John Bush of AllMusic gave the album 4.5 stars out of 5, describing it as "an irresistible romp through the lighthearted, pastoral side of trip-hop by way of orchestral pop paragons like Bacharach, Gainsbourg, and Love."

NME listed it as the 35th best album of 1998.

"She's My Lover" peaked at number 85 on the UK Singles Chart, while "Love Me Sweet" peaked at number 98.

Track listing

Personnel
Credits adapted from liner notes.
 Kid Loco – production, mixing
 Jendah Manga – bass guitar
 Nacer Arab – guitar (on "Relaxin' with Cherry")
 Katrina Mitchell – vocals (on "Love Me Sweet")
 R. Pépin – graphic design
 Benoit Gibert – sleeve
 120 – photography

References

External links
 

1997 albums
Yellow Productions albums
Kid Loco albums